Palestine Telecommunications (Paltel) Company ( شركة), listed in the Palestine Exchange (PEX) as PALTEL, is the largest employer (after the government) in Palestine, employing almost 3,000 people. Paltel Group consists of four companies: Palestine Telecommunications (Paltel), Palestine Cellular Communications Ltd. (Jawwal), Hadara Company (Internet provider), and Reach (Contact center). It was founded by Sabih Masri, chairman of the board of directors, in 1995, as a public shareholding company.

History 
In 1995, when Yasser Arafat set up the Palestine Telecommunications Company “Paltel”, only 3% of Palestinians owned a telephone; applicants would have to wait years for a connection by Bezeq, the Israeli state-owned provider. The initial three-year plan was to invest $600m in the West Bank and Gaza in order to increase customers from 85,000 to 250,000. An agreement was reached in 1997 to acquire fixed-telephony from Cable & Wireless, and in 1998 Ericsson won the contract to supply a GSM cellular network. That year Arafat called on mobile users to switch to Paltel which would soon become the sole provider in Palestine.

The mobile operator of PaltelGroup,  with its 2 million subscribers, has stopped a merger operation with Zain, but still will join the One Network project in the year 2010.
 
In 2015, Paltel and fellow provider Ooredoo were granted access by Israeli authorities to use 3G, something they were previously restricted from doing.

Controversies
In April 2016, the company's founding chief executive officer (CEO), Mohammad Mustafa, was named in the Panama Papers.

References 

Telecommunications companies of the State of Palestine
Palestinian brands
1995 establishments in the Palestinian territories